Muzong may refer to:

Emperor Muzong of Tang (795–824), Chinese emperor of the Tang dynasty, reigned 820–824
Emperor Muzong of Liao (931–969), Khitan emperor of the Liao dynasty, reigned 951–969
Emperor Muzong of Ming, or the Longqing Emperor (1537–1572), Chinese emperor of the Ming dynasty, reigned 1567–1572
Emperor Muzong of Qing, or the Tongzhi Emperor (1856–1875), Manchu emperor of the Qing dynasty, reigned 1861–1875

Temple name disambiguation pages